Emilio Butragueño Santos (born 22 July 1963) is a Spanish retired footballer who played as a striker.

He was best known for his spell with Real Madrid. Nicknamed El Buitre (The Vulture), he was a member of the La Quinta del Buitre along with Manolo Sanchís, Rafael Martín Vázquez, Míchel and Miguel Pardeza.

Butragueño scored a total of 123 La Liga goals in over 300 games for Real Madrid in 12 seasons, and represented the Spain national team in two World Cups (being the second-top scorer in the 1986 edition) and as many European Championships, scoring 26 goals for his country in a record that stood for several years.

Club career
In 1981, Madrid-born Butragueño joined Real Madrid youth system, playing first for their reserves before being given his senior debut by Alfredo Di Stéfano on 5 February 1984 against Cádiz CF: he made an instant impact, scoring twice and assisting for the third goal in a 3–2 away turnaround, after Real trailed by 2–0. On 12 December that year he made his European competition debut, contributing with a hat-trick to a 6–1 home triumph against R.S.C. Anderlecht for the third round of the UEFA Cup (after a 3–0 loss in Brussels), as the Spaniards went on to win the competition.

At the time, Real Madrid's form was so patchy the first team's attendances were smaller than those of the reserve side. Butragueño contributed to their transformation, and was a prominent member of the team during the 1980s, winning numerous honours: he received the European Bronze award for best footballer in two consecutive years, and won the Pichichi Trophy in 1991, while also being instrumental in the capital club's five La Liga trophies, two Copa del Rey and two consecutive UEFA Cups.

In June 1995, having lost his place (only eight games and one goal, as Real won another league), mainly due to the emergence of 17-year-old Raúl, Butragueño signed for Atlético Celaya in Mexico and, in his first year, the team reached the final of the Liga MX. After three seasons where he was known as the Gentleman of the Pitch – never receiving a single red card during his entire career – he finally decided to retire from the game in April 1998.

International career

Butragueño earned 69 caps for Spain, and scored 26 goals. His debut came on 17 October 1984 against Wales in a 1986 FIFA World Cup qualifier, although he had already been picked as an uncapped player for the UEFA Euro 1984 team as the nation finished runners-up.

Butragueño was also selected for the 1986 World Cup where he played a major part, scoring four goals as Spain beat Denmark 5–1 in the round-of-16 match. He also took part in the 1990 edition in Italy (four games, no goals).

Post-retirement and other ventures
On 19 October 2004, Butragueño replaced former Real Madrid teammate Jorge Valdano as the club's director of football and, until the end of the 2005–06 season, also served as its vice-president. Subsequently, he acted as head of public relations for the organisation.

Still as a player, Butragueño had a computer game with his name released in 1988, for the Amstrad CPC, Commodore 64, ZX Spectrum and MSX.

Career statistics

Club

International
Scores and results list Spain's goal tally first, score column indicates score after each Butragueño goal.

Honours
Real Madrid
La Liga: 1985–86, 1986–87, 1987–88, 1988–89, 1989–90, 1994–95
Copa del Rey: 1988–89, 1992–93
Copa de la Liga: 1985
Supercopa de España: 1988, 1989, 1990, 1993
UEFA Cup: 1984–85, 1985–86
Copa Iberoamericana: 1994

Spain
UEFA European Championship: Runner-up 1984

Individual
Bravo Award: 1985, 1986
Ballon d'Or: Third place 1986, 1987
Pichichi Trophy: 1990–91
FIFA World Cup Silver Boot: 1986
FIFA World Cup All-Star Team: 1986
Guerin Sportivo All-Star Team: 1986
FIFA 100
FICTS Hall of Fame and Excellence Guirlande d'Honneur

References

External links

1963 births
Living people
Footballers from Madrid
Spanish footballers
Association football forwards
La Liga players
Segunda División players
Real Madrid Castilla footballers
Real Madrid CF players
Liga MX players
Atlético Celaya footballers
UEFA Cup winning players
Spain under-21 international footballers
Spain amateur international footballers
Spain international footballers
UEFA Euro 1984 players
1986 FIFA World Cup players
UEFA Euro 1988 players
1990 FIFA World Cup players
Spanish expatriate footballers
Expatriate footballers in Mexico
Spanish expatriate sportspeople in Mexico
FIFA 100
Pichichi Trophy winners
Spanish beach soccer players